Kerri Seekins-Crowe is an American politician serving as a member of the Montana House of Representatives from the 43rd district. Elected in November 2020, she assumed office on January 4, 2021.

Education 
Seekings-Crowe earned a Bachelor of Business Administration from the University of Alaska Fairbanks and a Master of Business Administration from Campbell University.

Career 
Seekins-Crowe is a realtor. She previously was a customer service representative for Delta Air Lines. She previously served as an aide to Alaska Senator Ted Stevens. She has since worked as an adjunct professor of business at Montana State University Billings, Athens Technical College, Truett McConnell University, Bauder College, and Coastal Carolina Community College. Seekins-Crowe was elected to the Montana House of Representatives in November 2020 and assumed office on January 4, 2021.

Personal life 
Seekins-Crowe and her husband, Michael Crowe, have two children.

References 

Living people
University of Alaska Fairbanks alumni
Campbell University alumni
Delta Air Lines people
Republican Party members of the Montana House of Representatives
Women state legislators in Montana
Montana State University Billings faculty
Year of birth missing (living people)
21st-century American women